Goniohelia is a genus of moths of the family Erebidae. The genus was erected by George Hampson in 1926.

Species
Goniohelia astrapetes Hampson, 1926 Peru
Goniohelia fossula (Dognin, 1912) Peru
Goniohelia gallinago (Felder & Rogenhofer, 1874) Brazil (Amazonas)
Goniohelia pangraptica Hampson, 1926 Peru
Goniohelia phaegonia Hampson, 1926 Brazil (Espírito Santo)

References

Calpinae